Daniel Alejandro Bravo Silva (born 17 May 1982) is a Chilean lawyer and university teacher who was elected as a member of the Chilean Constitutional Convention.

References

External links
 Profile at Lista del Pueblo

Living people
1982 births
20th-century Chilean lawyers
21st-century Chilean politicians
Catholic University of the North alumni
Pontifical Catholic University of Valparaíso alumni
Members of the List of the People
Members of the Chilean Constitutional Convention